Josef Loibl (born 1939) is a German baritone and singing teacher.

Life 
Loibl was born in Schönbrunn, Baden-Württemberg. He studied at the Musikhochschule München, voice with the baritone Karl Schmitt-Walter and composition with Hermann Reutter. His technique is based in many areas on the voice-physiological knowledge of Frederick Husler and Yvonne Rodd-Marlings. He won a prize at the competition of Hertogenbosch, which caused international recognition and appearances. He worked exclusively in Lieder, cantata and oratorio repertoire.

His focus was the interpretation of Lieder. With his accompanists, including Hermann Reutter, Erik Werba, Jörg Demus, Helmut Deutsch, Norman Shetler and Fabio Luisi, he worked on numerous programs. Many of them were also recorded. In the field of oratorio, Loibl has performed the entire repertoire from baroque to contemporary.

For many years, Loibl was professor for voice at the University of Music and Performing Arts Graz. At the same time, he was head of a singing class as professor at the Musikhochschule München. He trained many notable singers including Annette Dasch, Mihoko Fujimura and Violeta Urmana. He has worked with singers especially in productions of the demanding stage works of Richard Wagner and Giuseppe Verdi. Loibl is regarded as one of the most renowned vocal teachers in Germany, and regularly gives master classes.

Recordings 
Loibl's CD recordings have been released at Fono Münster and Schwann. His recordings include:

Lieder:
 Schubert-Wolf (Goethe Lieder) with pianists Erik Werba and Norman Shetler
 Brahms-Wolf (selected Lieder) with Shetler
 Titel: Josef Loibl singt Balladen, ballads by Schubert, Loewe, Brahms, Mahler and Pfitzner, with pianists Fabio Luisi and Gerhard Zeller
 Schumann Op. 24 and Op. 35, with Shetler
 Mendelssohn (selected Lieder), with Luisi
 Schumann (Dichterliebe) – Schubert (selected Lieder), with pianists Rolf Koenen and Werba, 2009

Other:
 Bach (solo cantatas), with Münchner Kammerorchester conducted by Hans Stadlmair
 Mozart (concert arias), wirh Münchner Kammerorchester, conducted by Luisi

References

External links 
 
 
 Josef Loibl (Bass) Bach Cantatas Website
 

German baritones
Voice teachers
Academic staff of the University of Music and Performing Arts Graz
Academic staff of the University of Music and Performing Arts Munich
1939 births
Living people
Musicians from Baden-Württemberg